The non-marine molluscs of Kenya are a part of the molluscan fauna of Kenya (wildlife of Kenya).

A number of species of non-marine molluscs are found in the wild in Kenya.

There are 514 species of land snails in Kenya.

Freshwater gastropods 
Thiaridae
 Melanoides tuberculata (O. F. Müller, 1774)

Lymnaeidae
 Radix natalensis (Krauss, 1848)

Land gastropods 
Land gastropods in Kenya include:

Cyclophoridae
 Elgonocyclus koptaweliensis (Germain, 1934)

Maizaniidae
 Maizania elatior (Martens, 1892)
 Maizania volkensi (Martens, 1895)

Veronicellidae
 Laevicaulis stuhlmanni (Simroth, 1895)

Succineidae
 Quickia concisa (Morelet, 1849)

Valloniidae
 Pupisoma (Ptychopatula) dioscoricola (C. B. Adams, 1845)

Vertiginidae
 Nesopupa (Afripupa) bisulcata (Jickeli, 1873)
 Truncatellina ninagongensis (Pilsbry, 1935)
 Truncatellina pygmaeorum (Pilsbry & Cockerell, 1933)

Cerastidae
 Conulinus rutshuruensis Pilsbry, 1919
 Conulinus ugandae – subspecies: Conulinus ugandae costatus Verdcourt, 1985
 Edouardia metula (Martens, 1895)
 Rhachidina braunsi (Martens, 1869)

Achatinidae
 Limicolaria martensiana (E. A. Smith, 1880)
 Limicolaria saturata E. A. Smith, 1895

Ferussaciidae
 Cecilioides (Cecilioides) tribulationis (Preston, 1911)
 Cecilioides (Geostilbia) callipeplum (Connolly, 1923)

Micractaeonidae
 Micractaeon koptawelilensis (Germain, 1934)

Subulinidae
 Curvella babaulti Germain, 1923
 Euonyma curtissima Verdcourt
 Ischnoglessula elegans (Martens, 1895)
 Nothapalus paucispira (Martens, 1892)
 Nothapalus ugandanus Connolly, 1923
 Oreohomorus nitidus (Martens, 1897)
 Pseudopeas curvelliforme Pilsbry, 1919
 Pseudopeas elgonense Connolly, 1923
 Subulina entebbana Pollonera, 1907
 Subulona clara (Pilsbry, 1919)

Streptaxidae
 Gulella (Molarella) ugandensis (E. A. Smith, 1901)
 Gulella (Silvigulella) osborni Pilsbry, 1919
 Gulella (Wilmattina) disseminata (Preston, 1913)
 Stenomarconia Germain, 1934

Punctidae
 Paralaoma servilis (Shuttleworth, 1852)
 Punctum pallidum Connolly, 1922
 Punctum ugandanum (E. A. Smith, 1903)

Charopidae
 Afrodonta kempi (Connolly, 1925)
 Prositala butumbiana (Martens, 1895)
 Trachycystis iredalei Preston, 1912
 Trachycystis lamellifera (E. A. Smith, 1903)

Helicarionidae
 Kaliella barrakporensis (L. Pfeiffer, 1852)
 Kaliella iredalei Preston, 1912

Euconulidae
 Afroconulus iredalei (Preston, 1912)
 Afroguppya rumrutiensis (Preston, 1911)
 Afropunctum seminium (Morelet, 1873)

Urocyclidae
 Atoxon pallens Simroth, 1895
 Chlamydarion quentini Verdcourt, 2004
 Gymnarion aloysiisabaudiae (Pollonera, 1906)
 Trichotoxon heynemanni Simroth, 1888
 Trochozonites (Teleozonites) adansoniae (Morelet, 1848)
 Trochozonites (Zonitotrochus) medjensis Pilsbry, 1919

Freshwater bivalves
Sphaeriidae
 Pisidium artifex Kuiper, 1960

See also
 List of marine molluscs of Kenya

Lists of molluscs of surrounding countries:
 List of non-marine molluscs of Somalia, Wildlife of Somalia
 List of non-marine molluscs of Ethiopia, Wildlife of Ethiopia
 List of non-marine molluscs of Sudan, Wildlife of Sudan
 List of non-marine molluscs of Uganda, Wildlife of Uganda
 List of non-marine molluscs of Tanzania, Wildlife of Tanzania

References

External links 
 Lange C. N. (2003). "Environmental factors influencing land snail diversity patterns in Arabuko Sokoke forest, Kenya". African Journal of Ecology 41(4): 352–355.
 Tattersfield P. (1996). "Local patterns of land snail diversity in a Kenyan rain forest". Malacologia 38(1–2): 161–180.
 Tattersfield P., Warui C. M., Seddon M. B. & Kiringe J. W. (2001). "Land-snail faunas of afromontane forests of Mount Kenya, Kenya: ecology, diversity and distribution patterns". Journal of Biogeography 28(7): 843–861.
 Tattersfield P., Seddon M. B. & Lange C. N. (2001). "Land-snail faunas in indigenous rainforest and commercial forestry plantations in Kakamega Forest, western Kenya". Biodiversity and Conservation 10(11): 1809–1829. .

Non marine
Molluscs
Kenya
Kenya